Jayashankar Bhupalpally district is a district in the Indian state of Telangana. The district headquarters are located at Bhupalpally. It was a part of the erstwhile Warangal district and Karimnagar district prior to the re-organisation of districts in the state. The district share boundaries with Karimnagar, Mancherial, Peddapalli, Hanamkonda, Warangal, and Mulugu districts and with the state boundary of Maharashtra and Chhattisgarh.

Geography 

Jayashankar district is bounded on north by Mancherial district and Gadchiroli district of Maharashtra, on the northeast by Bijapur district of Chhattisgarh, on the southeast by Mulugu district, on the south by Warangal district, on west by Hanamkonda and Peddapalli districts.

Demographics 
 Census of India, the district has a population of 410,963. Scheduled Castes and Scheduled Tribes make up 22.21% and 8.70% of the population respectively.

Hindus are 96.21% of the population, while Muslims are 2.95% of the population.

At the time of the 2011 census, 95.41% of the district speaks Telugu, 2.09% Urdu and 1.76% Lambadi as their first language.

Administrative divisions 
The district will have One revenue division of Bhupalpally  and is sub-divided into 11 mandals. 

Bhavesh Mishra, IAS is the present collector of the district.

The below table categorizes mandals into their respective revenue divisions in the district:

Mandals 
The below table categorizes mandals into their respective revenue divisions in the district:

Assembly Constituencies 
There are 2 assembly constituencies in Bhupalapally district. They are Bhupalapalle, Manthani

See also 
 List of districts in Telangana

References

External links 

Districts of Telangana